The 2018–19 CBA season was the 24th season of the Chinese Basketball Association (CBA). In this campaign, the regular season expands from 38 games to 46 games, while the playoffs expand from 10 teams to 12 teams.

Team changes
The Shanxi Brave Dragons changed their official English name to the Shanxi Loongs at a lavish unveiling ceremony in September. “Loongs” is the Cantonese term for Dragons and was chosen by team ownership, even though people living in Shanxi speak Mandarin Chinese.

The Bayi Rockets began playing their home games in Nanchang after spending many years in Ningbo, and the Zhejiang Guangsha Lions began playing their home games in Zhuji to cultivate a fanbase away from central Hangzhou and stop splintering local support with the Zhejiang Golden Bulls.

Venues

Head coaches

Draft
The 2018 CBA Draft, the fourth edition of the CBA draft, took place on 29 July 2018. 14 players were selected in the draft.

Foreign players policy
All teams except the Bayi Rockets can have two foreign players. The bottom two teams from the previous season (except Bayi) have the additional right to sign an extra Asian player.

Rules Chart
The rules for using foreign players in each game are described in this chart:

+ Including players from Hong Kong and Taiwan.

++ If a team waives its right to sign an extra Asian player, it may use its 2 foreign players for 7 quarters collectively.

+++ Only 1 allowed in the 4th quarter.

Import chart
This is the full list of international players who competed in the CBA during the 2018-19 season.

 Sichuan and Bayi, the bottom two teams of last season, renounced the right of signing an Asian player.

Regular Season Standings

Playoffs

Statistics
The CBA is like the NCAA, and unlike the NBA, as the CBA combines regular season statistics with playoff statistics, so these lists are not yet final.

Statistical leaders – Individual

Statistical leaders – Team

Awards

Yearly awards
This is a list of the 2018–19 CBA season's yearly awards winners.

Players of the Week
This is a list of the 2018–19 CBA season's Player of the Week award winners.

Players of the Month
This is a list of the 2018–19 CBA season's Player of the Month award winners.

Young Rising Stars of the Month
This is a list of the 2018–19 CBA season's Young Rising Star of the Month award winners.

All-Star Weekend
The 24th CBA All-Star Game and associated events were held in Qingdao on January 12–13, 2019. Saturday featured the Rising Stars Challenge, in which a team of CBA Rookies & Sophomores faced a squad of students from the Chinese University Basketball Association, as well as the preliminaries of the Slam Dunk Contest, Three-Point Shootout, and Skills Competition. Sunday featured the All-Star Game, with the North hosting the South, and the finals of the three individual events taking place at halftime.

Notes

References

External links
CBA Official Website
CBA China - 2018-19 Standings and Stats on Basketball-Reference.com

 
League
Chinese Basketball Association seasons
CBA